Admiral Sir Robert John Prendergast KCB (9 July 1864–14 May 1946) was a Royal Navy officer.

Career
The son of a Surgeon-General occupying Ardfinnan Castle in Ireland, Prendergast entered the Royal Navy as a Cadet in 1877. He served in the Anglo-Egyptian War of 1882 as a Midshipman aboard the broadside ironclad HMS Achilles. In 1885 he transferred to the gunboat HMS Grappler at Gibraltar. He was promoted Lieutenant in June 1887 and joined the corvette HMS Volage in the Training Squadron in 1888. In 1889 he went to HMS Excellent to train as a gunnery officer and was then posted to the battleship HMS Collingwood and then to the frigate HMS Raleigh, flagship of the Training Squadron.

In 1899 he was promoted Commander and posted to HMS Northampton, a seagoing training ships for boys. In December 1901 he was posted to HMS Excellent, where he was promoted Captain. In 1904 he went to the Naval Ordnance Department at the Admiralty, and then commanded in succession the cruisers HMS Essex and HMS Carnarvon and the battleship HMS Implacable. In 1911 he was appointed Captain-Superintendent of Sheerness Dockyard.

In November 1914 he was promoted rear admiral, but remained at Sheerness. In May 1916 he was appointed Rear-Admiral Commanding Scapa Flow, hoisting his flag in the depot ship HMS Imperieuse and then the dockyard repair ship HMS Victorious. In March 1919 he was appointed Rear-Admiral Commanding, Orkneys and Shetlands. He was promoted vice admiral later that year and appointed Knight Commander of the Order of the Bath (KCB) in the 1920 New Year Honours, having been appointed Companion of the Order of the Bath (CB) the previous year. He retired in February 1920 when Scapa Flow was reduced to a peace footing, and was promoted Admiral on the retired list in 1924.

Death
Following retirement, Prendergast moved to Eastbourne, where he lived at Meads House and his Irish home at Ardfinnan Castle was sold out of the family. By 1946 he was senile and developed a bladder infection, for which he was treated by society doctor and suspected serial killer Dr John Bodkin Adams. Adams would visit twice a day and prescribed morphine. On the morning of 14 May 1946, Prendergast slipped into a coma and died at 7.30 p.m. that evening. Adams certified the death as a) uraemia and b) chronic nephritis. His nurse, Anne Masters, later told police, "I am quite convinced that the injections of morphia hastened Sir Prendergast's [sic] death". Adams was tried for the murder of Edith Alice Morrell in 1957 but acquitted, though police suspected him of a total of 163 murders.

Prendergast's ashes lie in niche 1077 of the east columbarium of Golders Green Crematorium on the 4th floor therein.

Arms

Footnotes

Sources
Cullen, Pamela V., A Stranger in Blood: The Case Files on Dr John Bodkin Adams, London, Elliott & Thompson, 2006,

References
Obituary, The Times, 16 May 1946

External links
 

1864 births
1946 deaths
Royal Navy admirals of World War I
Royal Navy personnel of the Anglo-Egyptian War
Knights Commander of the Order of the Bath
Deaths from nephritis
People educated at Stubbington House School